Paoua Airport  is an airport serving Paoua, a city in the Ouham-Pendé prefecture of the Central African Republic. The airport is on the northeast side of the city.

See also

Transport in the Central African Republic
List of airports in the Central African Republic

References

External links 
OpenStreetMap - Paoua
OurAirports - Paoua Airport
FallingRain - Paoua Airport

Airports in the Central African Republic
Buildings and structures in Ouham-Pendé